Koray Ariş (born in 1944, Adana) is a Turkish sculptor. He graduated from Şadi Çalıks atelier at the İstanbul Devlet Güzel Sanatlar Akademisi. He is known for his abstract sculptures made from metal, wood, leather and other materials which have earned a special place in Turkish sculpture.

Biography
Ariş was born in 1944 in Adana, Turkey. He graduated from the atelier of Şadi Çalık at the Istanbul State Fine Arts Academy sculpture department. Between 1969 and 1971 he worked in the sculpture atelier of Emilio Greco of the Rome University of Fine Arts. He founded his own atelier in Rome and then later in Istanbul and has participated in many personal and collaborative exhibitions.

His first solo exhibition was in Rome a year after when he opened his studio there in 1971. In the following years his works were displayed in many cities in Europe including Florence, Budapest and Belgrade. He returned to Turkey in 1975 where he started to teach at the Fine Arts Academy. After two years he quit left the Academy which is when he opened his Istanbul studio. For more than 25 years his works have been exhibited regularly in Istanbul and Ankara. In 2001 he designed masks for the Fire of Anatolia dance group/show which travel with the show around the world since then.

The exhibition "Memory and Scale: 15 Artists of Modern Turkish Sculpture” at İstanbul Modern included works by Ariş.

Personal exhibitions
1972 Galleria La Nuova Pesa, Rome
1973 Galleria L'indiano, Florence 
1976 DGSA Osman Hamdi Salonu, İstanbul 
1980 Galeri Bİ-Ze, İstanbul
1985 Maçka Sanat Galerisi, İstanbul
1986 Galeri Nev, Ankara
1988 Maçka Sanat Galerisi, İstanbul
1991 Galeri Nev, Ankara, İstanbul
1994 Galeri Nev, İstanbul 
1998 Akbank Aksanat Galerisi, İstanbul

References

Living people
1944 births
People from Adana
Academy of Fine Arts in Istanbul alumni
Rome University of Fine Arts alumni
Turkish male sculptors
Academic staff of Mimar Sinan Fine Arts University